William Fulton may refer to:

William S. Fulton (1795–1844), American lawyer and politician, Senator for Arkansas, 1836–1844
William Shirley Fulton (1880–1964), American archeologist who established the Amerind Foundation
William Fulton (1880s footballer) (fl. 1884), Scottish international footballer
William Fulton (boxer) (1916–?), Rhodesian boxer
William Fulton (footballer) (fl. 1897–1925), Scottish footballer (Sunderland, Bristol City, Derby County)
William Fulton (mathematician) (born 1939), American mathematician
William Fulton (urban planner) (born 1955), American author, urban planner and municipal politician
William D. Fulton (1864–1925), American politician in Ohio
William James Fulton (born 1968), Northern Irish loyalist
William J. Fulton (1875–1961), American jurist, Chief Justice of the Illinois Supreme Court
William B. Fulton (politician) (1877–1960), American politician in the Virginia House of Delegates
William Grant Fulton, South Africa Olympic field hockey player
William B. Fulton (U.S. Army), United States Army officer
Bill Fulton:
Bill Fulton (Queensland politician) (1909–1988), Australian Labor politician, Representative for Leichhardt (1958–1975)
Bill Fulton (composer) (born 1962), American composer
Bill Fulton (baseball) (born 1963), American professional baseball player for the New York Yankees
Bill Fulton (Victorian politician), Victorian state MP